The Agriculture Union is an affiliate of the Public Service Alliance of Canada (PSAC). It has more than 8,000 members who work for Canadian federal government departments and agencies such as the:
 Canadian Food Inspection Agency
 Agriculture & Agri-Food Canada, including
 Agri-Environment Services Branch
 Canada Agricultural Review Tribunal
 Canadian Pari-Mutuel Agency
 Canadian Grain Commission
 Canadian Dairy Commission
 Public Service Commission
 Department of National Defence (language training)
 Canada School of Public Service

History
In 1960 the Canada Agriculture National Employees' Association (CANEA), a national organization, was created to represent Canada Agriculture employees across Canada. In 1967, the CANEA became the newly formed Agriculture Union of the PSAC. The new Agriculture Union became one of the 16 founding staffing associations, representing almost 40 occupational groups, at the Presidents' Conference on Unity which negotiated a merger to form the PSAC.

COVID-19

On 11 May 2020, the embedded inspectors at slaughterhouses (as represented by the AU) said that CFIA management is "threatening disciplinary action against employees who refuse to be reassigned to work at COVID-19-infected meat plants", while Deputy PM Chrystia Freeland said that "those who feel unsafe won't be forced back to work."

Executive
2021-2023 Term
Milton Dyck, President
Patrick St-Georges, 1st National Executive Vice President
Randy Olynyk,  2nd National Executive Vice President
Dorothy McRae, 3rd National Executive Vice President
Audrey St-Germain, 4th National Executive Vice President

References

Canadian Labour Congress
Public Services International
UNI Global Union
Organizations based in Ottawa
Trade unions in Canada

Trade unions established in 1960
Public Service Alliance of Canada